Chiloglanis productus is a species of upside-down catfish endemic to Zambia where it is found in the Lunzua and Lufubu Rivers.  This species grows to a length of  SL.

References
 

productus
Catfish of Africa
Fish of Zambia
Endemic fauna of Zambia
Fish described in 2006